Kristine Ødegaard (born 1962) is a Norwegian ski-orienteering competitor. She won a bronze medal in the relay at the World Ski Orienteering Championships in Pontarlier in 1992, together with Anne Marit Korsvold and Hilde Gjermundshaug Pedersen.

References

1962 births
Living people
Norwegian orienteers
Female orienteers
Ski-orienteers
20th-century Norwegian women